Filip Gligorov (born 31 July 1993) is a Macedonian professional footballer who plays as a midfielder. In the past Gligorov played in Macedonia, Slovakia and Bosnia and Herzegovina, for teams such as: Rabotnički Skopje, Gorno Lisiče, KF Shkupi, Sileks Kratovo, Šamorín, Olimpik Sarajevo.

International career
Gligorov played in three matches for Macedonia U19, against Switzerland U19, Ukraine U19 and Kazakhstan U19.

Honours
Rabotnički
Macedonian Football Cup: Runner-up 2011–12

Olimpik Sarajevo
Bosnia and Herzegovina Football Cup: 2014–15

References

External links
 
 

1993 births
Living people
Footballers from Skopje
Association football defenders
Macedonian footballers
North Macedonia youth international footballers
FK Rabotnički players
FK Cementarnica 55 players
TJ Baník Ružiná players
FC ŠTK 1914 Šamorín players
FK Gorno Lisiče players
FK Olimpik players
FK Shkupi players
FK Sileks players
FC Dunărea Călărași players
KF Vllaznia Shkodër players
Macedonian First Football League players
2. Liga (Slovakia) players
Premier League of Bosnia and Herzegovina players
Liga I players
Kategoria Superiore players
Macedonian expatriate footballers
Expatriate footballers in Slovakia
Macedonian expatriate sportspeople in Slovakia
Expatriate footballers in Bosnia and Herzegovina
Macedonian expatriate sportspeople in Bosnia and Herzegovina
Expatriate footballers in Romania
Macedonian expatriate sportspeople in Romania
Expatriate footballers in Albania
Macedonian expatriate sportspeople in Albania